Mahtab Akbar Rashdi (، née Channa) is a Pakistani politician and actress who had been a Member of the Provincial Assembly of Sindh, from June 2013 to May 2018.

Early life and education
She was born on 3 March 1947 in Naudero. She earned the degree of Bachelor of Arts from Government Girls College Hyderabad. She received the Bachelor of Education and the degree of Master of Arts in Political Science, both from the University of Sindh. She also did Master of Arts in Political Science from University of Massachusetts on the Fulbright Scholarship.

In 1981, she married Akbar Rashidi, a Bureaucrat. Later, she herself joined bureaucracy and started heading several departments including education, information and culture.

In 2004, President of Pakistan awarded her the Pride of Performance for her services.

Acting career
She started her career as an actress and featured in many Pakistani dramas.

Political career

She was elected to the Provincial Assembly of Sindh as a candidate of Pakistan Muslim League (F) on a reserved seat for women in 2013 Pakistani general election.

References

External links
 

1947 births
Living people
20th-century Pakistani actresses
Pakistani actor-politicians
21st-century Pakistani actresses
Pakistani civil servants
Sindh MPAs 2013–2018
Pakistani television actresses
Pakistan Muslim League (F) politicians
University of Massachusetts Amherst College of Social and Behavioral Sciences alumni
University of Sindh alumni
People from Larkana District
Recipients of the Pride of Performance
21st-century Pakistani women politicians